Erin Boxberger (born May 26, 1993) is an American rower. In the 2018 World Rowing Championships, she won a gold medal in the women's coxless four event.

References

See also

1993 births
American female rowers
Living people
World Rowing Championships medalists for the United States
Place of birth missing (living people)
21st-century American women